Kevon Glickman (born November 5, 1960) is an American music producer and entertainment lawyer.   Previously, Glickman was President and CEO of RuffNation Records, a joint venture with Warner Bros. Records.   Glickman, has previously, and currently represents well known music, entertainment, and sports figures in legal matters and disputes including Jay-Z, former Wu-Tang Clan producer Selwyn Bougard, the widow of Teddy Pendergrass, and Kevin Pendergast.

References 

Living people
American entertainment lawyers
American entertainment industry businesspeople
20th-century American Jews
1960 births
Alumni of King's College London
21st-century American Jews